are the souls of the dead in Japanese folklore.

Summary

The daughter became afraid, and she was able to get relatives and friends to come, but even then the father's  appeared to try to take her away. After one month, he finally stopped appearing.

References

Japanese ghosts
Japanese folklore
Goryō faith